Watts Bar may refer to:

 Watts Bar Nuclear Plant
 Watts Bar Dam
 Watts Bar Steam Plant
 Watts Bar Lake